Ulrike Hanna Meinhof is Professor in the Department of Modern Languages at the University of Southampton in Hampshire, previously having worked as a professor and Chair of Cultural Studies at the University of Bradford in West Yorkshire. She is a specialist in discourse analysis. Her main areas of research currently involve ethnographic research in European border communities and a comparative media-project about the 20th century on television.

Meinhof is the author of Language Learning in the Age of Satellite Television, published by Oxford University Press.

Works
Text, Discourse and Context: Representation of Poverty in Britain. (with K. Richardson, eds.), London & New York: Longman, 1994
Masculinity and Language (with S. Johnson, eds.) Oxford: Blackwell, 1997
Language Learning in the Age of Satellite Television. Oxford University Press, 1998
Worlds in Common? Satellite discourse in a changing Europe (with Kay Richardson), London & New York: Routledge, 1999
Intertextuality and the Media: from Genre to Everyday life (with Jonathan M. Smith, eds.) Manchester and New York: Manchester University Press, 2000

External links
How soaps improve speech skills
Page at Oxford University Press
Loughborough University CV 
Professor Ulrike Hanna Meinhof, University of Southampton

20th-century births
Academics of the University of Bradford
Living people
Discourse analysts
Place of birth missing (living people)
Sociolinguists
Year of birth missing (living people)